General House of Municipal Corporation Chandigarh is the legislature for the Municipal Corporation Chandigarh.
  
Contesting the Chandigarh Municipal Corporation elections for the first time, Aam Aadmi Party won 14 seats and became the single largest party in the council of total 35 elected seats. Sitting mayor Ravi Kant Sharma from BJP lost his seat to AAP candidate Damanpreet Singh.

Composition of Chandigarh Municipal Corporation after 2021 Chandigarh Municipal Corporation election.

Two Congress members defected to BJP after election.

Current members 

Nominated Councillors

References

Municipal corporations in India
Politics of Chandigarh